Auricélio Neres Rodrigues (born August 28, 1976), or simply Rodrigues, is a Brazilian striker.

Rodrigues scored the only goal in the Blades' Round 3 game against Zhejiang Green Town, the club's first ever victory in the Chinese Super League.

He joined Hubei Luyin on 20 February 2010.

References

External links

1976 births
Living people
Brazilian footballers
Brazilian expatriate footballers
Comercial Futebol Clube (Ribeirão Preto) players
Sertãozinho Futebol Clube players
Clube Náutico Capibaribe players
Americano Futebol Clube players
Paulista Futebol Clube players
Jiangsu F.C. players
Shanghai Shenhua F.C. players
Chengdu Tiancheng F.C. players
Wuhan F.C. players
Chinese Super League players
China League One players
Expatriate footballers in China
Brazilian expatriate sportspeople in China
People from Teresina
Association football forwards
Sportspeople from Piauí